Walter Nolen (born c. 2003) is an American football defensive tackle for the Texas A&M Aggies. He was rated by ESPN and USA Today as the No. 1 recruit in the 2022 college football recruiting class.

Early years
Nolen played high school football at three different schools: Olive Branch High School in Olive Branch, Mississippi, as a freshman and sophomore; Saint Benedict at Auburndale in Memphis as a junior; and Powell High School in Powell, Tennessee, as a senior. He also enrolled for a time at IMG Academy but did not play there. His coach at Powell, Matt Lowe, described him as "a young man who has been blessed with size, speed and athleticism."

In his senior year at Powell, he had 93 tackles, 33 tackles for loss, 27 quarterback hurries, and 17 sacks. He was rated by ESPN as the No. 1 football recruit in the 2022 recruiting class. He was ranked No. 2 by Rivals.com and 247Sports, behind Travis Hunter.

After his senior year, he was invited to play in the Under Armour All-America Game. In July 2022, he was named Defensive Football Player of the Year by USA Today. He was also rated by USA Today as the country's No. 1 recruit for 2022.

College career
Nolen received offers from numerous schools and narrowed his final five to Alabama, Florida, Georgia, Michigan, and Tennessee. In November 2021, Nolen committed to play college football for Texas A&M. He later paid an official visit to Tennessee, raising speculation that his commitment was uncertain. He then signed his letter of intent with Texas A&M in December 2021. He was part of a recruiting class at Texas A&M that is rated as the best in the history of recruiting rankings.

References

External links
 Texas A&M bio

Living people
American football defensive tackles
Texas A&M Aggies football players
Players of American football from Tennessee
Sportspeople from Knox County, Tennessee
Year of birth missing (living people)